The 2004 European Wrestling Championships were held in the men's freestyle in Ankara and men's Greco-Roman style, and the women's freestyle in Haparanda.

Medal table

Medal summary

Men's freestyle

Men's Greco-Roman

Women's freestyle

References

External links
Official website
Fila's official championship website

Europe
W
W
European Wrestling Championships
Euro
Euro
Sports competitions in Ankara
2004 in European sport